Alanson Cooke (September 23, 1811 – April 28, 1904) was a Canadian businessman and political figure.

He was born in L'Orignal, Upper Canada in 1811, the son of an American-born lumber merchant. He took over his father's business around 1837. He was agent for the seigneury of Petite-Nation and managed the sawmill there; Cooke later became owner of the sawmill. He served in the local militia, becoming lieutenant-colonel in 1860. In 1845, he became a member of the municipal council for Petite-Nation. In 1854, he was elected to the Legislative Assembly of the Province of Canada for the County of Ottawa. He was mayor of Saint-André-Avellin from 1862 to 1864 and also served as a member of the council for Ottawa County.

He died at Hintonburg (later part of Ottawa) in 1904 and was buried at Papineauville, Quebec.

External links

The Canadian men and women of the time : a handbook of Canadian biography, HJ Morgan

1811 births
1904 deaths
Members of the Legislative Assembly of the Province of Canada from Canada East
Mayors of places in Quebec
Canadian people of American descent
Burials in Quebec